Ahmet Enes, (full name Ahmet Enes Karaçam Muratpaşa, Erzurum) (b. December 18, 1984, Erzurum), Turkish composer and songwriter, performer.

Biography 

He grew up and completed his education in Üsküdar, İstanbul. He started his live radio shows on Radyo 7 and İstanbul'un Sesi while he was an undergrad. In 2007, his live radio show has been awarded as "The Best Radio Show of The Year" by Gazete 365.

He graduated from Istanbul University as a journalist in 2008 and then he moved to Washington to get certificate on journalism. Back after, Ahmet Enes worked for TRT Haber as an editor, TRT Müzik as a performer and İSTWEB TV as a voiceover artist. His song 'Cennet', which he composed at the end of 2010, attracted great attention on social media. In April 2013, he released his first solo album, Ahval, consisting of 10 songs with lyrics and music belonging to him, with Pasaj Music label.

In 2017, he became the father of a son named Emir Ada.

He started a live music format radio program called 'Sıradan' on Radyo D in 2019.

In 2021, he started to publish his works independently with Avrupa Müzik.

Discography 
Studio albums

EP's

Singles

Music videos

Duets

Contributed albums

Awards

References 
"Vikipedi" (Translated from Turkish) Access: 26 May 2015
"Ahvâl" Access: 15 April 2013
"Ahmet Enes 'Ahvâl' ile iddialı geliyor" (Translated from Turkish) Access: 8 January 2013
"Ahmet Enes Ahvâl'ini anlattı"  (Translated from Turkish) Access: 9 May 2013
"Ahmet Enes'in ilk albümü 'Ahvâl' çıktı" (Translated from Turkish) Access: 5 August 2013
"Ahmet Enes Ahvâl’ini bildiriyor" (Translated from Turkish) Access: 8 April 2013
"Cennet şarkısı hit olan Ahmet Enes albüm çıkardı" (Translated from Turkish) Access: 6 August 2013
"Ahmet Enes Biyografi" (Translated from Turkish) Access: 10 August 2014
"Ahmet Enes ile 'Sıradan' Bir Röportaj" (Translated from Turkish) Access: 10 August 2014
"Ahmet Enes'ten Az Çok"  (Translated from Turkish) Access: 29 January 2015
"Ahmet Enes kimdir?" (Translated from Turkish) Access: 6 March 2015

External links 
 
 
 Ahmet Enes on Spotify
 
 Ahmet Enes on iTunes

Living people
Year of birth missing (living people)
Turkish male singers
Turkish composers
Turkish lyricists
Turkish pop singers
Turkish-language singers
Turkish journalists
Turkish poets